Todor Skrimov (born 9 January 1990) is a Bulgarian professional volleyball player, a member of the Bulgaria national team, and a participant at the Olympic Games London 2012. At the professional club level, he plays for Yenisey Krasnoyarsk.

Honours

Clubs
 CEV Challenge Cup
  2013/2014 – with Andreoli Latina

 National championships
 2012/2013  French Championship, with Paris Volley

Individual awards
 2011: French Championship – Best Receiver

External links

 
 Player profile at LegaVolley.it  
 Player profile at Volleybox.net 

1990 births
Living people
People from Pernik
Bulgarian men's volleyball players
Olympic volleyball players of Bulgaria
Volleyball players at the 2012 Summer Olympics
Bulgarian expatriate sportspeople in France
Expatriate volleyball players in France
Bulgarian expatriate sportspeople in Italy
Expatriate volleyball players in Italy
Bulgarian expatriate sportspeople in Russia
Expatriate volleyball players in Russia
Paris Volley players
Outside hitters